Rosalind Anne Eeles is a Professor of Oncogenetics at the Institute of Cancer Research and clinician at the Royal Marsden NHS Foundation Trust. She is a leader in the field of genetic susceptibility to prostate cancer, and is known for the discovery of 14 genetic variants involved in prostate cancer predisposition. According to ResearchGate, Eeles has published more than 500 articles in peer-reviewed journals, with over 34,000 citations and an h-index of 92. Eeles was elected a Fellow of the Academy of Medical Science in 2012. She was awarded a National Institute for Health Research Senior Investigator Emeritus in 2014.

Education 
Eeles completed her medical training at the University of Cambridge and St Thomas' Hospital Medical School, and trained in Clinical Oncology at The Royal Marsden NHS Foundation Trust. She completed a PhD in cancer genetics at the Institute of Cancer Research, finishing her thesis in 2000.

Research 
Eeles' research is focussed on the genetic causes of prostate cancer and identifying patients with increased risk of developing the disease. She leads a UK clinical trial investigating the impact of regular screening for patients with increased risk of prostate cancer due to BRCA mutations. Eeles also established PRACTICAL, an international consortium that allows researchers to share genetic data from prostate cancer patients. Her research group are part of the International Cancer Genome Consortium (ICGC).

Selected works

References

External links
 ResearchGate

Year of birth missing (living people)
Living people
British geneticists
Cancer researchers
NIHR Senior Investigators
Fellows of the Academy of Medical Sciences (United Kingdom)
Physicians of the Royal Marsden Hospital
Women medical researchers